The 2012 Melbourne Storm season was the club's 15th NRL season. Coached by Craig Bellamy and captained by Cameron Smith, they competed in and won the NRL's 2012 Telstra Premiership. The first 9 weeks of the season were very successful, with the club winning all games for what was at the time their best start to a season. From Round 10 to Round 21 they won only 3 games and lost 7, including a 5-game losing streak between Rounds 16 and 21, their second worst ever. From Round 22 onward they recovered their winning form and finished the regular season with five straight wins, finishing in second place. The Storm then went on to defeat South Sydney and Manly in the finals series before going on to face minor premiers, the Canterbury-Bankstown Bulldogs in the 2012 NRL Grand Final, winning 14-4 to claim the Premiership.

Season summary 
 Round 3 - Billy Slater scored two tries against the Gold Coast Titans to take his career total to 130, becoming the highest try scoring fullback in Australian Rugby League history.
 Round 4 - Billy Slater scored a try double for the fourth consecutive week, a career first. 
 Round 5 (Heritage Round) - The Storm celebrated their 15th Anniversary and Bryan Norrie played his 50th game.
 Round 7 - The Storm equalled their best start to a season (2007) with their 7th straight win.
 Round 8 - The Storm recorded an eighth straight win over the New Zealand Warriors, completing the best start to a season in the club's history.
 Round 9 - The Storm won their ninth straight game.
 Round 10 - The Storm conceded their first match of the season in an away game, losing 12-10 to the Cronulla Sharks.
 Round 12 - Will Chambers played his 50th NRL game while Todd Lowrie played his 50th game for the Storm, 
 Round 13 - Todd Lowrie played his 150th NRL game.
 Round 14 - Craig Bellamy coached his 250th game for the Melbourne Storm against the Wests Tigers. Ryan Hoffman was acting captain, with Cameron Smith on Origin duty.
 Round 19 - Cooper Cronk played his 200th NRL game.
 Round 20 - With their fourth consecutive loss, the Storm equalled their second worst losing streak in the club's history to date.
 Round 21 - With their fifth consecutive loss, the Storm recorded a new second-worst losing streak. It was the Storm's longest losing streak during Craig Bellamy's ten-year tenure.
 Round 22 - The Storm ended their losing streak with a 46-6 defeat of the Penrith Panthers. The game was notable for Sisa Waqa scoring the NRL season's fastest try after only 35 seconds of play. It was also the Storm's biggest score of the season.
 Round 23 - Mahe Fonua made his debut as the first fully born and bred Victorian to play NRL for the Storm. Jessie Bromwich also played his 50th game for the Storm.
 Round 24 - Cameron Smith scored his 1300th career point.
 Round 25 - The Storm recorded a 20-18 win against the Cronulla Sharks with two tries inside the final three minutes of play, after trailing 18-10. The result meant that the Storm's overall wins percentage increased to 63.64%, elevating the Storm to first place on the 'all-time' score table for the first time, ahead of the Brisbane Broncos.
 Finals Week 1 - The Storm began their finals campaign with a win over the South Sydney Rabbitohs, earning them a week's break and a home preliminary final.
 Finals Week 3 - The Storm completed a 40 - 12 defeat of Manly to secure a spot in the 2012 NRL Grand Final against the Canterbury Bulldogs.
 Grand Final - The Storm defeated the Canterbury Bulldogs 14 - 4 to claim the 2012 NRL premiership. Cameron Smith, while having a bad night with the boot (1 from 5 attempts), kicked his 600th career goal. The Grand Final was also notable because it was the first to feature a scoreless second half of football.

Milestone games

Jersey
In 2012 the Storm jerseys were made by Kooga. Both the predominantly purple 'home' jersey, and the predominantly white 'away' jersey for 2012 were first instituted by the club in 2010.

Special jerseys
Round 5 (NRL Heritage round): replica of the original 1998 jersey.
Round 12 (vs the Brisbane Broncos): a special silver V with purple camouflage jersey. A similar jersey was worn in the same game in 2011.
Round 19 (vs the North Queensland Cowboys): a one-off promotional jersey was worn to promote The Dark Knight Rises. The jersey was predominantly black with the Batman logo on the front and back.
Round 22 (vs the Penrith Panthers): the "Close the Gap" jersey. "Close the Gap" is an Oxfam initiative to influence Australian government healthcare and Indigenous policies with an aim to achieve health equality for Indigenous Australians by 2030. The NRL began supporting this campaign with a "Close the Gap Round" in 2010.

Statistics 
Statistics source:
Statistics current following the Grand Final.

Most points in a game: 14
 Cameron Smith with 1 try and 5 goals vs Manly in Round 15 (18 June 2012).
 Cameron Smith with 7 goals vs Penrith in Round 22 (4 August 2012).

Most tries in a game: 3
 Will Chambers vs New Zealand in Round 8 (25 April 2012).
 Justin O'Neill vs Penrith in Round 9 (5 May 2012).

Fixtures

Pre season

Regular season

Finals

Ladder

2012 Coaching Staff

NRL
 Head coach: Craig Bellamy
 Assistant coaches: David Kidwell & Kevin Walters
 Development coach: Adam O'Brien
 Specialist coach: Robbie Kearns
 Tackling Coach: John Donohue
 Performance coach: Mick Martin
 Strength and conditioning Coach: Alex Corvo
 Assistant Strength and Conditioning Coaches: Adrian Jiminez & Dan Di Pasqua
 Head physiotherapist: Kieran Morgan
 Assistant physiotherapist: Andrew Nawrocki
 Head Trainer: Craig Sultana
 General Manager Football Operations: Frank Ponissi
 Recruitment manager: Paul Bunn

NRL Under 20s
 Head coach: Dean Pay
 Assistant coach: Troy Thompson
 Development coaches: Tony Adam & Chad Buckby
 High Performance Manager: Chris Jones
 Physiotherapist: Aaron Howlett
 Strength and conditioning Coach: Adrian Jiminez

2012 Squad

2012 Premiership Team

2012 player movement
2012 squad signings

2012 squad transfers

Representative honours
The following players have played a representative match in 2012. (C) = Captain

Awards

Trophy Cabinet
 2012 Provan-Summons Trophy

Melbourne Storm Awards Night
Held at Melbourne Convention Centre on Friday 5 October 2012.

 Melbourne Storm Player of the Year: Cameron Smith
 Melbourne Storm Rookie of the Year: Mahe Fonua
 Melbourne Storm Members' Player of Year: Cooper Cronk
 Most Improved: Sisa Waqa
 Best Forward: Ryan Hoffman
 Best Back: Cooper Cronk
 Best Try: Gareth Widdop vs Gold Coast Titans (Round 23)
 Feeder Club Player of the Year:
 Darren Bell U20s Player of the Year: Young Tonumaipea
 U20s Best Back: Kirisome Auva'a
 U20s Best Forward: Karl Davies
 Greg Brentnall Young Achievers Award: Young Tonumaipea
 Mick Moore Club Person of the Year: Frank Ponissi
 Life Member Inductee: Cooper Cronk & Alex Corvo

Dally M Awards Night
On 4 August 2012, the 2012 Dally M Awards were held. 
 Dally M Halfback of the Year: Cooper Cronk
 Dally M Hooker of the Year: Cameron Smith

RLIF Awards Night
On 17 October 2012 the RLIF held their annual award ceremony and presented a number of awards to Melbourne Storm personnel including naming Cameron Smith the 'International Rugby League Player of the Year'.

 RLIF International Player of the Year: Cameron Smith
 RLIF International Coach of the Year:Craig Bellamy
 RLIF Halfback of the Year: Cooper Cronk
 RLIF Hooker of the Year: Cameron Smith
 RLIF Fijian Player of the Year: Sisa Waqa

Additional Awards
Clive Churchill Medal: Cooper Cronk
Sprit of ANZAC Medal: Kevin Proctor

Notes

References

Melbourne Storm seasons
Melbourne Storm season